André Rossinot (born 22 May 1939) is a French politician. He is a medical doctor  specialist in Otolaryngology. He is a member of the Radical Party.

Between 1978 and 1997, he was a member of the French National Assembly. From 1993 until 1995, he was the Minister of Civil Service. He is an officer of the Légion d'honneur and an honorary member of the Académie de Stanislas.

Rossinot, currently the president of the Urban Community of Nancy, is the former mayor of Nancy (Meurthe-et-Moselle) and honorary president of the Radical Party. He was president of the party at different points in the 1980s, 1990s and 2000s, before and after it aligned with the UMP.

External links

1939 births
Living people
People from Briey
Politicians from Grand Est
Radical Party (France) politicians
Union for French Democracy politicians
Union of Democrats and Independents politicians
French Ministers of Civil Service
Deputies of the 6th National Assembly of the French Fifth Republic
Deputies of the 7th National Assembly of the French Fifth Republic
Deputies of the 8th National Assembly of the French Fifth Republic
Deputies of the 9th National Assembly of the French Fifth Republic
Deputies of the 10th National Assembly of the French Fifth Republic
Mayors of Nancy, France
20th-century French physicians
French otolaryngologists